Timothy L. Burgess (born March 18, 1949) is an American journalist and politician from Seattle, Washington. He was a member of the Seattle City Council from 2007 to 2017, and served as Mayor of Seattle for 71 days in late 2017. Prior to his political career, Burgess was a radio journalist and Seattle Police Department (SPD) officer.

Burgess was appointed as mayor by the city council on September 18, 2017, to serve the remaining term of Ed Murray, who resigned amid a sexual abuse scandal. Burgess replaced the acting mayor, Council President Bruce Harrell, and served as mayor until the 2017 mayoral election results were certified on November 28.

Burgess was first elected to the city council in November 2007 with 64% of the vote. He was re-elected with 83% of the vote to a second four-year term in November 2011. Burgess chaired the City Council's Education and Governance Committee and was vice-chair of the Planning, Land Use and Sustainability Committee. He was elected Council President by his colleagues for 2014–2015 and was also co-chair of the City's Family and Education Levy Oversight Committee. Prior to his election to the City Council, Burgess chaired his neighborhood community council and served 12 years on Seattle's Ethics and Elections Commission.

Early life and career

Burgess was born to a working class, Christian family in Seattle's Capitol Hill neighborhood, the youngest of three brothers. He described his family as "very poor", and their home was foreclosed when Burgess was 12 years old, moving into a rented home in Eastlake. Burgess graduated from Lincoln High School in Wallingford in 1967 and attended classes at North Seattle Community College before transferring to the University of Washington. He volunteered for Republican presidential candidate Barry Goldwater during his youth, and was part of his middle school's Republican club.

Burgess joined radio station KJR in the news department while in college, covering issues related to the Seattle Police Department, including corruption trials in county courts. He worked alongside future councilmember and mayor Norm Rice and covered future county councilmember Larry Gossett during his time with the local Black Panthers. After the election of mayor Wes Uhlman in 1970, Burgess left radio journalism and joined the Seattle Police Department as a police officer, seeking to be part of Uhlman's plans for reform. He dropped out of the University of Washington, eight credits short of a bachelor's degree in political science, due to a shift change. Burgess patrolled in the High Point neighborhood of West Seattle for two years, in what he described as an "eye-opening" experience seeing "the effects of violence, injustice, [and] poverty". He moved to the police department's public relations arm in 1972, eventually serving as the press aide to Police Chief Robert Hanson from 1974 to 1978. While with the police department, Burgess also served as a burglary detective.

Burgess left the police department in 1978 for World Concern, a Seattle-based Christian humanitarian organization working on anti-poverty initiatives, to work as a communications and public relations manager. Burgess returned to Seattle in 1985 and started an advertising agency, Seattle, Burgess & Associates (later, The Domain Group), which he ran until selling the agency to Merkle in 2005. The company had an annual revenue of $70 million and more than 200 employees at the time of its sale.

Political career

Burgess chaired the Queen Anne Community Council in the 1990s and served on the Seattle Ethics and Elections Commission from 1989 to 2001, chairing the commission for five years. Burgess publicly criticized city councilmembers for their ties to organized crime and campaign-finance violations during the Strippergate scandal of 2003, taking a leading role in calling for accountability in his position as former ethics commissioner.

Burgess began considering a run for the Seattle City Council in late 2006, while on a bike trip in Italy during his retirement. He announced his candidacy in January 2007, intending to run against one-term incumbent David Della. Burgess was the only challenger to Della, advancing automatically to the November general election. Burgess was criticized by Della for his advertisement agency's work for a conservative Christian group that opposes abortion and gay marriage, despite Burgess's personal beliefs. Burgess received the endorsement of The Seattle Times, along with several state and local politicians, and ultimately won in the election with 64 percent of votes. The race for Position 8 was the most expensive in city council history, with Burgess raising $64,000 of his $293,000 using his own money.

Burgess was sworn in as a new councilmember in January 2008 and was elected to chair the Public Safety, Human Services and Education Committee.

Burgess was re-elected by 83 percent of voters in the November 2011 election, defeating architect David Schraer.

Burgess ran for mayor in the 2013 mayoral election, looking to unseat incumbent Mike McGinn, but dropped out before the primary filing deadline. He endorsed Ed Murray, who later was elected mayor. Burgess was named Council President from 2014 to 2015. He was elected to a third term in 2015, defeating Jon Grant with over 60 percent of votes. Burgess announced that he would not seek re-election in 2017, as he was one of the most senior councilmembers and sought to step aside and "move on".

After the resignation of Mayor Ed Murray on September 13, 2017, Burgess was named as a leading candidate to become interim mayor until November. Council President and acting mayor Bruce Harrell declined to continue the term, and Burgess was elected to the role of mayor in a 5–1 vote of the city council on September 18, 2017. His 71-day term as mayor, which he described as "accidental", included the signing of the 2018 budget. After the certification of the 2017 mayoral election results on November 28, 2017, Jenny Durkan became mayor.

Personal life

Burgess married his wife Joleen, a former editor at the Seattle Post-Intelligencer, in 1979. They have three daughters and live on Queen Anne Hill in Seattle.

Burgess is a Christian and attends church at a Presbyterian church on Queen Anne Hill on a weekly basis. He described his faith in 2012 to The Stranger as being "absolutely anchored to forgiveness and grace". He identified as a Republican early in his life, but later became a Democrat over his personal values.

References

External links
 Council homepage
 Personal blog

Living people
Seattle City Council members
Seattle Police Department officers
21st-century American politicians
Mayors of Seattle
1949 births